Zalesye (area beyond the forest) or Opolye (area in the fields) is a historical region of Russia, comprising the north and west parts of Vladimir Oblast, the north-east of Moscow Oblast and the south of Yaroslavl Oblast. As the kernel of the medieval state of Vladimir-Suzdal, this area played a vital part in the development of Russian statehood.  

The name Zalesye alludes to the deep woods that used to separate the medieval Principality of Rostov from the Republic of Novgorod and from the Dnieper principalities. Merians, Muroma, and other Volga Finnic tribes inhabited also the area. There was a strong interaction between the Slavs and Finnic peoples in these territories.

In the twelfth century, this fertile area, being well protected from Turkic incursions by the forests, provided a favourable oasis for Slavic people migrating from the southern borders of Kievan Rus. The population of the area rapidly increased and by 1124 reached the point when Yuri Dolgoruki found it expedient to move his princely seat from Rostov in the Upper Volga Region to Suzdal in Zalesye.

Suzdal was the oldest and most senior town of Zalesye. Yuri established other important urban centres in Pereslavl-Zalessky (founded 1152), Yuriev-Polsky (1152), Dmitrov (1154), Starodub-on-the-Klyazma (1152), Vladimir-Zalessky (1108), Ksnyatin (1136), and Yaropolch-Zalessky (1136). The descriptors Zalessky ("beyond the woods") and Polsky ("in the fields") served to distinguish new cities from their eponyms in the south – in modern-day Ukraine.

Perpetually at odds with the powerful Suzdalian boyardom, Yuri even contemplated moving his capital from Suzdal to the new town of Pereslavl-Zalessky. His unexpected death (1157) forestalled this plan, but Yuri's son Andrew the Pious finally moved the princely seat to another young town, Vladimir, in 1157. The old nobility of Rostov and Suzdal, however, arranged Andrew's assassination (1174) and a brief civil war for supremacy in Zalesye followed.

During the Mongol invasion of the Kieven Rus' (1223–1240), when the woods were gradually being cleared and new centres developed in Moscow, Tver, and elsewhere, the strategic importance of Zalesye declined. New urban centres developed around famous monasteries (e.g., Sergiev Posad, Kirzhach) or near royal residences (eg: Alexandrov, Radonezh).

References 

Historical regions in Russia
Historical regions
Vladimir-Suzdal
Geography of Vladimir Oblast
Geography of Moscow Oblast
Geography of Yaroslavl Oblast
Subdivisions of Kievan Rus'
Regions of Russia